Lynn Martin (born in Washington, D.C., USA) is an American television soap opera writer.  She is a graduate of Georgetown University and Columbia University.

Positions held
Another World
 Script Writer (1998–1999)

As the World Turns
 Script Writer (1999–2005)

The City
 Script Writer (1996–1997)

Port Charles
 Script Writer (1997–1998)

Awards and nominations
Daytime Emmy Award
Nomination, 2006, Best Writing, As the World Turns
Win, 2005, Best Writing, As the World Turns
Win, 2004, Best Writing, As the World Turns
Nomination, 2003, Best Writing, As the World Turns
Win, 2002, Best Writing, As the World Turns
Win, 2001, Best Writing, As the World Turns
Nomination, 2000, Best Writing, As the World Turns

Writers Guild of America Award
Nomination, 2005, Best Writing, As the World Turns
Win, 2020, Best Writing, The Young and The Restless

External links

American soap opera writers
American women television writers
Year of birth missing (living people)
Living people
Women soap opera writers
Screenwriters from Washington, D.C.
Georgetown University alumni
21st-century American women